Miss Piauí is a Brazilian Beauty pageant which selects the representative for the State of Piauí at the Miss Brazil contest. The pageant was created in 1956 and has been held every year since with the exception of 1990-1991, 1993, and 2020. The pageant is held annually with representation of several municipalities. Since 2020, the State pageant is under the direct leadership of the Miss Universe Brazil Organization. 

Piauí has won only one crown in the national contest:
Monalysa Maria Alcântara Nascimento, from Teresina, in 2017

Gallery of Titleholders

Results Summary

Placements
Miss Brazil: Monalysa Maria Alcântara Nascimento (2017)
1st Runner-Up: Maria Gabriela Silva Lacerda (2021)
2nd Runner-Up: 
3rd Runner-Up: 
4th Runner-Up: 
Top 5/Top 8/Top 9: 
Top 10/Top 11/Top 12: Mirza dos Santos Melo (1983); Lainny de Fátima Holanda (1997); Naiely Raquel Lima Moura (2018); Dagmara da Silva Landim (2019)
Top 15/Top 16: Marinna de Paiva Lima (2008); Ana Letícia Alencar (2015); Jessyca Machado Silva Castro (2022)

Special Awards
Miss Congeniality: 
Miss Be Emotion: 
Miss Popular Vote: 
Best State Costume:

Titleholders

Table Notes

References

External links
Official Miss Brasil Website

Women in Brazil
Piauí
Miss Brazil state pageants